This is a list of schools in primary and secondary education in Northern Cyprus.  Tertiary schools are maintained at the list of universities and colleges in Northern Cyprus. The schools are listed according to their highest level of education.

Primary schools
This list includes active primary schools in Northern Cyprus. Some of the listed primary schools may also have pre-school sections. Primary schools provide the initial 5 years of the 12-year school education.

Public
Public schools are owned by the state and governed by the Ministry of Education and Culture. There is no tuition fee for public schools.

Lefkoşa District
Source:

 9 Eylül İlkokulu
 Arabahmet İlkokulu
 Akıncılar İlkokulu
 Alayköy İlkokulu
 Atatürk İlkokulu
 Balıkesir-Meriç İlkokulu
 Cihangir-Düzova İlkokulu
 Çağlayan Cumhuriyet İlkokulu
 Değirmenlik İlkokulu
 Dilekkaya İlkokulu
 Gelibolu İlkokulu
 Gönyeli İlkokulu
 Hamitköy Dr. Fazıl Küçük İlkokulu
 Haspolat İlkokulu
 Necati Taşkın İlkokulu
 Şehit Doğan Ahmet İlkokulu
 Şehit Ertuğrul İlkokulu
 Şehit Mehmet Eray İlkokulu
 Şehit Tuncer İlkokulu
 Şehit Yalçın İlkokulu

Gazimağusa District
Source:
	 
 Akdoğan Dr. Fazıl Küçük İlkokulu
 Akova-Yıldırım İlkokulu	
 Alaniçi İlkokulu
 Alasya İlkokulu	
 Beyarmudu İlkokulu
 Canbulat İlkokulu
 Çayönü-İncirli İlkokulu
 Dortyol İlkokulu
 Eşref Bitlis İlkokulu	
 Gazi İlkokulu
 Geçitkale İlkokulu
 Güvercinlik Rauf Raif Denktaş İlkokulu
 İnönü İlkokulu
 Karakol İlkokulu
 Mormenekşe İlkokulu
 Polatpaşa İlkokulu
 Serdarlı İlkokulu
 Şehit Hüseyin Akil İlkokulu
 Şehit Mustafa Kurtuluş İlkokulu
 Şehit Osman Ahmet İlkokulu
 Şehit Salih Terzi İlkokulu
 Şehit Zeki Salih İlkokulu
 Tatlısu İlkokulu
 Türkmenköy İlkokulu
 Ulukışla İlkokulu
 Vadili İlkokulu
 Yeniboğaziçi İlkokulu

Girne District
Source:

 23 Nisan İlkokulu
 Ağırdağ-Dağyolu İlkokulu	
 Alsancak İlkokulu
 Bahçeli İlkokulu
 Çamlıbel Aysun İlkokulu
 Çatalköy İlkokulu
 Dikmen İlkokulu
 Esentepe İlkokulu
 Karakum İlkokulu
 Karaoğlanoğlu İlkokulu
 Karşıyaka Merkez İlkokulu
 KTEV Şehit Hasan Cafer İlkokulu	
 Lapta İlkokulu
 Mehmet Boransel İlkokulu
 Tepebaşı İlkokulu

Güzelyurt District
Source:

 Aydınköy İlkokulu
 Barış İlkokulu
 Fikri Karayel İlkokulu
 Kurtuluş İlkokulu
 Özgürlük İlkokulu
 Serhatköy İlkokulu		
 Zümrütköy İlkokulu

İskele District
Source:

 Boğaziçi İlkokulu	
 Büyükkonuk İlkokulu
 Çayırova İlkokulu
 Dipkarpaz İlkokulu
 Kaplıca İlkokulu	
 Kumyalı İlkokulu
 Mehmetçik İlkokulu
 Ötüken İlkokulu	
 Şehit İlker Karter İlkokulu
 Şehit Menteş Zorba İlkokulu	
 Yedikonuk İlkokulu	
 Yenierenköy İlkokulu	
 Ziyamet İlkokulu

Lefke District
Source:

 Doğancı İlkokulu
 Erdal Abit İlkokulu
 Gaziveren İlkokulu
 Lefke İstiklal İlkokulu
 Yedidalga İlkokulu	
 Yeşilyurt İlkokulu

Other
Source:
 Bellapais School (Girne District)
 British Culture College (Lefkoşa District)
 Doğa International Schools (Girne District)
 Doğu Akdeniz Doğa İlkokulu (Gazimağusa District)
 Final İlkokulu (Gazimağusa District)
 Future Amerikan İlkokulu (Lefkoşa District)
 Girne Amerikan İlkokulu (Girne District)
 Levent İlkokulu (Lefkoşa District)
 Yakın Doğu İlkokulu (Lefkoşa District)
 Δημοτικά Σχολεία Ριζοκαρπάσου-Dipkarpaz Rum İlkokulu (Dimotika Scholeia Rizokarpasou/Rizokarpaso Primary School) (İskele District)

Secondary schools providing primary and pre-school education
 Necat British College (Girne District)
 The English School of Kyrenia (Girne District)
 TED Kuzey Kıbrıs Koleji (Lefkoşa District)

Middle schools
This list includes active middle schools in Northern Cyprus. Middle schools provide the 3 years of the 12-year school education from year 6 to year 8.

Public
Source:

Public schools are owned by the state and governed by the Ministry of Education and Culture. There is no tuition fee for public schools.

 Atleks Sanverler Ortaokulu
 Bayraktar Türk Maarif Koleji
 Bayraktar Ortaokulu
 Canbulat Özgürlük Ortaokulu	
 Çanakkale Ortaokulu
 Demokrasi Ortaokulu
 Dipkarpaz Recep Tayyip Erdoğan Ortaokulu
 Esentepe Ortaokulu
 Mehmetçik Ortaokulu
 Oğuz Veli Ortaokulu
 Şehit Hüseyin Ruso Ortaokulu	 
 Şehit Turgut Ortaokulu	 
 Şehit Zeka Çorba Ortaokulu

High schools
For the extended list of high schools in Northern Cyprus, see list of secondary schools in Northern Cyprus.

See also
 Education in Northern Cyprus
 Lists of schools

External links
 Ministry of Education and Culture webpage

References 

Buildings and structures in Northern Cyprus by type
Education in Northern Cyprus
Organisations based in Northern Cyprus
Schools in North
Schools in North
Schools in North
Northern Cyprus
Northern Cyprus
Northern Cyprus

Schools